Ali Zohuran (also Romanized as ‘Alī Z̧ohūrān) is a village in Hur Rural District, in the Central District of Faryab County, Kerman Province, Iran. At the 2006 census, its population was 173, in 39 families.

References 

Populated places in Faryab County